The Julian Bunn Davidson House is a historic house at 410 South Battery Street in Little Rock, Arkansas.  It is the only formerly residential structure in Arkansas capitol district, currently housing state offices.  It is a single-story Mid-Century Modern structure, designed by local architect Julian Bunn Davidson for his family and built in 1951.   It is a high-quality example of the modern style, and the only one in this region of the city.

The house was listed on the National Register of Historic Places in 2014.

See also
National Register of Historic Places listings in Little Rock, Arkansas

References

Houses on the National Register of Historic Places in Arkansas
Houses completed in 1951
Houses in Little Rock, Arkansas
National Register of Historic Places in Little Rock, Arkansas